Haji Alias Md Ali (c. 1939 – 10 March 2014) was a Malaysian politician and former news editor of Bernama. He served as an MP for Hulu Terengganu from 1978 to 1995. He was also the former chairman of Agro Bank Malaysia.

Personal life
Alias Md Ali was born in Kuala Berang, Terengganu. He received a bachelor's degree in creative writing from Iowa State University in the US. In 1950, he was elected the leader of the Hulu Terengganu Umno Youth. In 1960, he was appointed as the vice-chairman of the Terengganu Tengah Development Authority.

In 1957, Alias began his career as a reporter for Berita Harian. He then joined the staff of the Utusan Melayu newspaper, where he became the paper's chief news editor from 1968 to 1970. In 1970, Alias Ali became the chief sub-editor of Bernamas Malaysian language division. He was later promoted to editor of the General News Service of Bernama. He resigned from Bernama in 1978 to enter politics.

Political career
In 1978, Alias was elected to the Parliament of Malaysia for the Hulu Terengganu constituency as a member of the United Malays National Organisation (UMNO). He defeated his opponent, Mohd Ghazali Ahmad of the Pan-Malaysian Islamic Party (PAS), by 4,370 votes. He was re-elected to Parliament from Hulu Terengganu in the next four general elections. He was appointed as the Deputy Minister of Primary Industries from 1987 to 1990. Alias declined to seek re-election in 1995 and retired from office.

Death
Alias died from colon cancer at his son's home in Prima Villa, Kemensah Heights, Ampang, on 10 March 2014, at the age of 75. He was survived by his wife, To' Puan Ramlah Datuk Abdul Rahman; two sons; three daughters; and fifteen grandchildren.

 Election Results 

Honours
Honours of Malaysia
  :
  Companion of the Order of Loyalty to the Crown of Malaysia (JSM) (1991)
  :
  Knight Commander of the Order of the Crown of Terengganu (DPMT) - Dato'''' (1988)

Books
 Gersang, (1964)
 Krisis, (1966)
 Selasih Ku Sayang, (1967)
 Kalau Berpaut Di Dahan Rapuh, (1967)
 Adat Muda Menanggung Rindu'', (1971)

See also

 Hulu Terengganu (federal constituency)
 Ahmad Sidi Ismail

References

1930s births
2014 deaths
People from Terengganu
Malaysian people of Malay descent
Malaysian Muslims
Malaysian editors
Malaysian journalists
Members of the Dewan Rakyat
United Malays National Organisation politicians
Iowa State University alumni